Sollebrunn is a locality situated in Alingsås Municipality, Västra Götaland County, Sweden. It had 1,440 inhabitants in 2010. It is the site of Erska Church.

References 

Populated places in Västra Götaland County
Populated places in Alingsås Municipality